Straughn may refer to:

Straughn, Alabama
Straughn, Indiana
Straughn (surname)